At least two ships of the French Navy have been named Trombe (meaning waterspout):

 , a  launched in 1900.
 , a  launched in 1925 and scuttled in 1942.

French Navy ship names